Comet Siding Spring, discoveries made at Siding Spring Observatory, may refer to:
 Periodic comets:
 162P/Siding Spring (P/2004 TU12)
 P/2004 V3
 P/2006 HR30
 P/2006 R1
 P/2012 US27
 Non-periodic comets:
 C/2004 T3
 C/2006 HW51
 C/2007 K3
 C/2007 Q3, which came to perihelion in 2009
 C/2010 A4
 C/2012 OP
 C/2013 A1, which made a close approach to Mars on 19 Oct 2014